"51st State" is a single by New Model Army, which appeared on their 1986 album The Ghost of Cain. The lyrics to the song were believed to be behind a ban by the American Musician's Union on the band, which prevented them touring the Ghost of Cain album in the United States.

The track was released as a single, on EMI and reached 71 in the UK Singles Chart, spending just two weeks in the listing. It was the band's fourth appearance in that chart.

Formats and track listing 
UK 7" single (NMA 4)
"51st State" (Ashley Cartwright, New Model Army)
"Ten Commandments" (Justin Sullivan)

UK 12" single (12 NMAS 4)
"51st State"
"Ten Commandments"
"A Liberal Education" (live) (Sullivan, Stuart Morrow)
"No Rest" (live) (Sullivan, Morrow, Robert Heaton)
"No Man's Land" (live) (Sullivan)

UK 12" single doublepack (12 NMA 4D)
Disc one
"51st State"
"Ten Commandments"
Disc two (PSLP 348)
"A Liberal Education" (live)
"No Rest" (live)
"No Man's Land" (live)

Holland 12" single (2018046)
"51st State"
"Ten Commandments"
"A Liberal Education" (live)
"No Rest" (live)

References 

1985 songs
1986 singles
Song recordings produced by Glyn Johns
New Model Army (band) songs
EMI Records singles